Dante Micheli (10 February 1939 – 10 June 2012) was an Italian footballer who played as a forward. He scored 68 goals from 479 league appearances, of which more than 250 were made in Serie A.

Micheli played for Mantova, SPAL, Fiorentina and Foggia. He was a member of the Fiorentina team that defeated Rangers 4–1 to win the 1960–61 European Cup Winners' Cup.

References

External links
 Footballdatabase.eu profile

1939 births
2012 deaths
Sportspeople from Mantua
Italian footballers
Association football forwards
Mantova 1911 players
S.P.A.L. players
ACF Fiorentina players
Calcio Foggia 1920 players
Serie A players
Serie B players
Serie C players
Footballers from Lombardy